Emotion is the twenty-third studio album of pop singer Barbra Streisand, issued in October 1984 by Columbia Records four years after the release of Guilty, which has since become her highest selling studio album worldwide. The album was promoted with the release of three singles, but none of them entered the top ten of the Billboard Hot 100.  The album has been certified Platinum in the US by the RIAA and Gold in the UK by the BPI.

Overview
This album was recorded in eleven studios in Los Angeles and two in New York with a multitude of producers and composers. Produced by Jim Steinman, "Left in the Dark" was the lead single peaking at #50 on the Billboard Hot 100. "Make No Mistake, He's Mine", a duet with Kim Carnes, was the album's second single and charted at #8 on the Adult Contemporary chart and #51 on the  Billboard Hot 100. The final single "Emotion", featuring the Pointer Sisters on background vocals, was also released as extended 12" remix.

An instrumental version of "Here We Are At Last" appeared on the soundtrack of the 1987 feature film Nuts.

The video for "Left in the Dark" reunited Streisand with Kris Kristofferson, her co-star from A Star Is Born. The video to the album's title track "Emotion", which received some airplay on MTV, featured cameos from The Who's Roger Daltrey and Mikhail Baryshnikov.

The album peaked at #19 on the US Billboard 200 and #15 on the UK Pop Album chart. Emotion has also been certified Platinum in the US by the RIAA and Gold in the UK by the BPI.

Track listing

Unreleased songs
"When the Lovin' Goes Out of the Lovin'"
"How Do You Keep the Music Playing" (this song was later re-recorded and included on The Movie Album).

Personnel
Barbra Streisand – vocals
Roy Bittan – piano
Abraham Laboriel, Lee Sklar, Neil Stubenhaus, Nathan East, Steve Buslowe, Bob Lizik – bass guitar
Peter Bliss – programming, guitar
Bill Cuomo – piano, synthesizer
Robbie Buchanan – keyboards, synthesizer, programming
Randy Waldman, Michel Colombier – synthesizer
James Newton Howard – keyboards
Steve Mitchell – synthesizer, Hammond B-3
Albhy Galuten – synthesizer, keyboards
Gary Mallaber, Max Weinberg, Tom Radke, Russ Kunkel, Vinnie Colaiuta – drums
Ed Tossing – piano, Fender Rhodes
Paulinho Da Costa, Joe Porcaro, Jimmy Maelen, Steve Forman – percussion
Gary Chang – additional synthesizer, programming
Paul Jackson Jr., Don Felder, Steve Lukather, Rick Derringer, Dann Huff, Craig Hull, George Doering, Bruce Gaitsch – guitar
Ray Kelley – cello
Lon Price, Jerry Peterson, John Phillips - saxophone
Maurice White, Maxine Willard Waters, Clydene Jackson, Julia Tillman Waters – backing vocals

Charts

Weekly charts

Year-end charts

Certifications and sales

References

External links
Streisand on making of the "Emotion" video

1984 albums
Barbra Streisand albums
Albums produced by Maurice White
Albums produced by Richard Perry
Columbia Records albums
Albums recorded at Capitol Studios
Albums recorded at United Western Recorders